Bythocyprididae is a family of crustaceans belonging to the order Podocopida.

Genera:
 Anchistrocheles Brady & Norman, 1889
 Bythocypris Brady, 1880
 Bythopussella Warne, 1990
 Orlovibairdia McKenzie, 1977
 Zabythocypris Maddocks, 1969

References

Ostracods